Timothy Blackwell (born 10 August 1981) is an Australian radio broadcaster. Blackwell is currently part of Nova FM's national drive show, Kate, Tim & Joel with Kate Ritchie and Joel Creasey.

Early life 
Blackwell grew up in Hobart, Australia. He then moved to Washington DC at the age of thirteen with his mother and step-father before returning to Hobart in his late teens.

Career 
Blackwell's first job in radio at Nova was in 2001, where he joined Nova 100 as Melbourne's late night announcer. In 2002 he moved to Perth to host Nova 93.7’s local drive show and was the first voice heard on air when the station launched with a Red Hot Chili Peppers interview.

From 2006 to 2008, Blackwell worked on Nova 100’s Hughesy & Kate's Melbourne breakfast show as an anchor, before teaming up with Hayley Pearson to host the night show, Launchpad. In 2009, he was a co-host alongside Meshel Laurie on Nova 106.9’s Brisbane breakfast show, and from 2010, Marty Sheargold joined the team to become Meshel, Tim & Marty. In 2011 they became the Nova Network’s national drive team replacing Fitzy and Wippa. After Meshel Laurie departed in 2014, Kate Ritchie joined the drive show which became known as Kate, Tim and Marty.

Blackwell regularly appears on Network Ten’s The Project, Nine Nine’s Today Extra and Getaway, and as a passionate AFL supporter, Tim is also involved in the Hawthorn Football Club.

References

External links 
 

Living people
Australian mass media people
1981 births